Chrysops fasciatus is a species of deer fly in the family Tabanidae.

Distribution
Andaman Islands, Borneo, Myanmar, Sri Lanka, India, Java, Malaysia, Sumatra.

References

Tabanidae
Insects described in 1821
Diptera of Asia
Taxa named by Christian Rudolph Wilhelm Wiedemann